The 1987 WCHA Men's Ice Hockey Tournament was the 28th conference playoff in league history and 35th season where a WCHA champion was crowned. The tournament was played between February 27 and March 14, 1987. First round and semifinal games were played at home team campus sites while the championship match was held, for the final time, at the Winter Sports Center in Grand Forks, North Dakota. By winning the tournament, North Dakota was awarded the Broadmoor Trophy and received the WCHA's automatic bid to the 1987 NCAA Division I Men's Ice Hockey Tournament.

Format
All member teams were eligible for the tournament and were seeded No. 1 through No. 8 according to their final conference standing, with a tiebreaker system used to seed teams with an identical number of points accumulated. The top four seeded teams each earned home ice and hosted one of the lower seeded teams. As a result of their being the regular season champion, North Dakota's home venue, Winter Sports Center, served as the site for the Championship game regardless of which teams qualified for the penultimate match. Each series were two-game matchups with the team that scored the most goals advancing to the succeeding round. The teams that advanced to the semifinal were re-seeded No. 1 through No. 4 according to the final regular season conference standings, with the top remaining seed matched against lowest remaining seed in one semifinal game while the two other semifinalists meeting with the winners advancing to the championship round. The Tournament Champion received an automatic bid to the 1987 NCAA Division I Men's Ice Hockey Tournament.

Conference standings
Note: GP = Games played; W = Wins; L = Losses; T = Ties; PTS = Points; GF = Goals For; GA = Goals Against

Bracket

Teams are reseeded after the first round

Note: * denotes overtime period(s)

First round

(1) North Dakota vs. (8) Minnesota-Duluth

(2) Minnesota vs. (7) Michigan Tech

(3) Denver vs. (6) Colorado College

(4) Wisconsin vs. (5) Northern Michigan

Semifinals

(1) North Dakota vs. (6) Colorado College

(2) Minnesota vs. (4) Wisconsin

Championship

(1) North Dakota vs. (2) Minnesota

Tournament awards
None

See also
Western Collegiate Hockey Association men's champions

References

External links
WCHA.com
1986–87 WCHA Standings
1986–87 NCAA Standings
2013–14 Colorado College Tigers Media Guide
2013–14 Denver Pioneers Media Guide
2013–14 Minnesota Golden Gophers Media Guide 
2012–13 Minnesota-Duluth Bulldogs Media Guide
2013–14 North Dakota Hockey Media Guide
2006–07 Northern Michigan Wildcats Media Guide
2003–04 Wisconsin Badgers Media Guide

WCHA Men's Ice Hockey Tournament
Wcha Men's Ice Hockey Tournament